Horikawa Street (堀川通 ほりかわどおり Horikawa dōri) is one of the mayor streets running from north to south in the city of Kyoto, Japan. It extends about 8 km from the Misono-bashi bridge near the Kamigamo Shrine (north) to Hachijō Street, near Kyoto Station (south).

History 
In the past, the street was divided in two by the Horikawa river, being the Higashi Horikawa Street on the west side and the Nishi Horikawa Street on the east side, having both the same width.  During the period between 1895 and 1961 the Kyōto Denki Tetsudō tram line operated between the intersection of Horikawa and Nakadachiuri streets, and the intersection of Shijō Street and Horikawa street. During WWII, the houses along Nishi Horikawa Street were removed in order to create a firewall and, due to later city planning, it was expanded, eventually becoming a highway. In March of 2009, a construction project to improve the condition of the Horikawa river was completed, restoring the clear stream and creating a promenade with benches and open spaces.

Relevant landmarks along the street 

 Honpō-ji Temple
 Urasenke Chado Research Center (裏千家茶道資料館)
 Nishijin Textile Center
 Seimei Shrine
Ichijō Modori Bashi (一条戻橋)
Horikawa Shopping Street (堀川商店街)
 Nijō Castle
 Hotel Ana Crowne Plaza Kyoto
 Nijōjō-mae Subway Station
 Nakagyō-ku Ward Office
 Kyoto Tokyu Hotel
 Nishi Hongan-ji Temple
 Rihga Royal Hotel Kyoto

References

Links 
 Urasenke Chado Research Center
 Nishijin Textile Center

Streets in Kyoto